Matthew Clark McEwan (5 October 1865 – 14 April 1899), known as Saxon McEwan, was a Scotland international rugby union player.

Rugby Union career

Amateur career

McEwan played for Edinburgh Academicals. He earned the nickname 'Saxon'.

Provincial career

McEwan played for East of Scotland District against West of Scotland District on 31 January 1885. He again played for East of Scotland District in the 1886 fixture, the 1887 fixture, and the 1888 fixture. He captained the East side in the 1889 match.

McEwan played for Edinburgh Dsitrict in the 1886 inter-city fixture against Glasgow District, the 1887 fixture and the 1888 fixture.

International career

Refereeing career

McEwan refereed one international match in the Home Nations Championship; the 1892 match between England and Wales. Remarkably he was a still a Scotland international player at this point, and he later played for Scotland in that season's championship.

Family

He was born to Thomas McEwan (1834-1895) and Agnes Clark (1840-1914). He was the brother of Bill McEwan who was also capped for Scotland.

References

Sources

Bath, Richard (ed.) The Scotland Rugby Miscellany (Vision Sports Publishing Ltd, 2007 )

1865 births
1899 deaths
East of Scotland District players
Edinburgh Academicals rugby union players
Edinburgh District (rugby union) players
Rugby union players from Ayr
Scotland international rugby union players
Scottish rugby union players
Scottish rugby union referees